Yekaterina Kuryshko (born 12 April 1949) is a Soviet sprint canoer who competed in the early 1970s. At the 1972 Summer Olympics in Munich, she won a gold medal in the K-2 500 m event. Kuryshko also won two medals at the 1971 ICF Canoe Sprint World Championships in Belgrade with a gold  in the K-4 500 m event and a bronze in the K-2 500 m event.

References

External links

1949 births
Living people
Canoeists at the 1972 Summer Olympics
Olympic canoeists of the Soviet Union
Olympic gold medalists for the Soviet Union
Soviet female canoeists
Olympic medalists in canoeing
Ukrainian female canoeists
Dynamo sports society athletes
Medalists at the 1972 Summer Olympics
ICF Canoe Sprint World Championships medalists in kayak
Sportspeople from Poltava Oblast